The Southport Broadwater Parklands is a large community park located in Southport. It is designed for large community gatherings and families. The park has many different areas for children and barbecue areas for families. The park went through a major redevelopment and was re-opened  by the Premier of Queensland, Anna Bligh, on 23 August 2009. Southport Broadwater Parklands has become a popular family attraction.

Getting here

Public parking 
The Southport Broadwater Parklands is situated parallel to the Gold Coast Highway and opposite Australia Fair Shopping Centre. The park has several onsite car parks for visitors and on-street parking is also available along the Gold Coat Highway. Both on-street parking and onsite parking are managed by the City of Gold Coast and require a fee.

Public transport 
The public park is accessible by several forms of public transport. The most convenient form of transport is the G:link. This is a light rail line operating from Broadbeach South to Gold Coast University Hospital via Surfers Paradise and Southport. There is a G:link station located just a few hundreds meters from the entrance to the parkland. Trams run every 8 minutes during peak times. Southport Bus Station is only a few minutes' walk from the entrance to the park and provides bus connections to neighboring suburbs.

History

The Southport Broadwater Parklands was first declared a public space in November 1928. At the time the area featured a pier and a series of enclosed public baths. Over several years the original pier deteriorated and was eventually removed. In the 1960s the Southport Pool was constructed.

In 2005 and 2006, the Queensland Government and the Gold Coast City Council began background consultation for the redevelopment of the parklands. By late 2006 a draft master plan was developed. Throughout July and August 2007 community consultation was held on the plan. From August to November 2007 design development took place by EDAW. After some discussions with key stakeholders in October 2007, the final master plan was released in December. The contractor, Abigroup, was appointed shortly after. Construction of stage 1 began in March 2008. After close to one and a half years' construction, the Southport Broadwater Parklands opened on 23 August 2009. Construction of stage 2 began shortly after the opening of stage 1 and was completed by the end of 2010.

Redevelopment
 
The Queensland Government and Gold Coast City Council invested over $42 million on stage 1 of the redevelopment of the Southport Broadwater Parklands. The main objectives of the design were to:
 Re-connect the Gold Coast central business district with the Gold Coast Broadwater
 Celebrate 150 years of Queensland as a separate entity from New South Wales
 Generate a sense of community, regional identity and celebrate the history of Southport
 Provide an events space to attract large events such as the Yugambeh Corroboree Food, Art and Language Festival, Gold Coast Marathon, the Pan Pacific Games, the World Championship Triathlon, and the 2018 Commonwealth Games

 only two stages have been constructed and opened; however, additional development was proposed in the master plan.

Stage 1
Construction of stage 1 began in March 2008. After close to one and a half years' construction, the Southport Broadwater Parklands opened on 23 August 2009. It included:
The great pier extends 100m out into the Broadwater and provides views of Surfers Paradise, The Spit and Southport.
The events lawn hosts some of the city’s largest events including the Gold Coast Airport Marathon and Carols by Candlelight.
There are also places to have a picnic, to kick a ball, toss a frisbee, or simply relax and enjoy the views of the open Broadwater.
A public stage with a large outdoor screen provides a spot to watch movies.
The Pavilion building, with a rooftop deck offering elevated views, has park information, public toilets and showers. There will be bike lockers to encourage commuters to use ‘pedal power’ to travel to and from Southport.
A new pedestrian crossing links Nerang Street and the Southport CBD to the parklands in place of the existing underpass.
Walkways and bridges encourage exploration of the ‘urban wetland’, and of cascading water and reed-filled ponds that collects, cleans and filters stormwater before it goes into the Broadwater.
A boulevard of fig trees provides a shaded space, ideal for farmers’ markets, picnics and summer promenades.
Coastal casuarinas provide shady spots along the shoreline, for family gatherings.
Unique artwork was unveiled at the launch of Stage One of the parklands.
There is a landscaped car park for approximately 200 vehicles.

Stage 2

Construction of stage 2 began shortly after the opening of stage 1 and was completed by the end of 2010. It included:
Rockpools - a coastal themed environment featuring a variety of water activities
ANZAC Park - the relocation of the war memorial to a new location overlooking the Broadwater
Viewing platform
Operations hub - for maintenance staff
Picnic space - landscaped area featuring barbecues

Future development
The final master plan detailed a number of other developments that have yet to take place. These include:
 The relocation of the Gold Coast Highway to run alongside Australia Fair Shopping Centre
 The development of an 'Old Shoreline' Water Garden next to the relocated highway
 An extended swimming enclosure
 Venues for the 2032 Summer Olympics and 2032 Summer Paralympics

See also

 Sports on the Gold Coast, Queensland

References

External links

 
 Southport Broadwater Parklands master plan
 ABC News - Council committee backs Southport parklands master plan

2018 Commonwealth Games venues
Sports venues on the Gold Coast, Queensland
Buildings and structures on the Gold Coast, Queensland
Southport, Queensland
Tourist attractions on the Gold Coast, Queensland
2009 establishments in Australia
Venues of the 2032 Summer Olympics and Paralympics
Triathlon at the 2018 Commonwealth Games